National Route 479 is a national highway of Japan. The highway connects Toyonaka, Osaka and Suminoe-ku, Osaka.

References

479
Roads in Osaka Prefecture